In mathematics, an Albert algebra is a 27-dimensional exceptional Jordan algebra. They are named after Abraham Adrian Albert, who pioneered the study of non-associative algebras, usually working over the real numbers. Over the real numbers, there are three such Jordan algebras up to isomorphism.

where  denotes matrix multiplication.  Another is defined the same way, but using split octonions instead of octonions. The final is constructed from the non-split octonions using a different standard involution.

Over any algebraically closed field, there is just one Albert algebra, and its automorphism group G is the simple split group of type F4.  (For example, the complexifications of the three Albert algebras over the real numbers are isomorphic Albert algebras over the complex numbers.)  Because of this, for a general field F, the Albert algebras are classified by the Galois cohomology group H1(F,G).

The Kantor–Koecher–Tits construction applied to an Albert algebra gives a form of the E7 Lie algebra. The split Albert algebra is used in a construction of a 56-dimensional structurable algebra whose automorphism group has identity component the simply-connected algebraic group of type E6.

The space of cohomological invariants of Albert algebras a field F (of characteristic not 2) with coefficients in Z/2Z is a free module over the cohomology ring of F with a basis 1, f3, f5, of degrees 0, 3, 5.  The cohomological invariants with 3-torsion coefficients have a basis 1, g3 of degrees 0, 3.  The invariants f3 and g3 are the primary components of the Rost invariant.

See also
Euclidean Jordan algebra for the Jordan algebras considered by Jordan, von Neumann and Wigner
Euclidean Hurwitz algebra for details of the construction of the Albert algebra for the octonions

Notes

References

Further reading
 
 
 Albert algebra at Encyclopedia of Mathematics.

Non-associative algebras